The Turkish Naval Forces or Turkish Navy is the naval warfare service branch of the Turkish Armed Forces.

Submarine fleet

Surface fleet

Combatant ships

Mine and Amphibious Warfare

Auxiliary fleet

Weapon systems

Ship and submarine weapons

Aircraft 
These are aircraft in Turkish Naval Forces command. For other aircraft see List of active aircraft of the Turkish Air Force page.

Future projects

See also
 Military equipment of Turkey
 Lists of ships of the Turkish Navy
 List of equipment of the Turkish Land Forces
 List of modern weapons of the Turkish Air Force
 Turkish Gendarmerie#Equipment
 Turkish Coast Guard#Equipment

References

External links

 Turkish Navy  – Official website
 Turkish Naval Museum – Official website
 Bosphorus Naval News – Latest news, photos and fleet data regarding the Turkish Navy

Ships of the Turkish Navy
Active ships
Naval ships of Turkey
Turkey